German Flood Service Medal may refer to:

German Flood Service Medal (2002)
German Flood Service Medal (2013)